The National Central Library of Florence (BNCF) is a public national library in Florence, the largest in Italy and one of the most important in Europe, one of the two central libraries of Italy, along with the Biblioteca Nazionale Centrale di Roma.

History
The library was founded in 1714 when scholar Antonio Magliabechi bequeathed his entire collection of books, encompassing approximately 30,000 volumes, to the city of Florence. By 1743, it was required that a copy of every work published in Tuscany be submitted to the library. Originally known as the Magliabechiana, the library was opened to the public in 1747. Since 1870, the library has collected copies of all Italian publications.

Since 1935, the collections have been housed in a building designed by Cesare Bazzani and V. Mazzei, located along the Arno River in the quarter of Santa Croce. Before this, they were found in various rooms belonging to the Uffizi Gallery.

The National Library System (SBN), located in the BNCF, is responsible for the automation of library services and the indexing of national holdings.

Unfortunately, a major flood of the Arno River in 1966 damaged nearly one-third of the library's holdings, most notably its periodicals and Palatine and Magliabechi collections. The Restoration Center was subsequently established and may be credited with saving many of these priceless artifacts. However, much work remains to be done and some items are forever lost.

Thesaurus

The library curates the Nuovo soggettario, a "subject indexing tool for various types of resources".

Gallery

Exteriors

Interiors

Manuscripts

See also
 Books in Italy
 List of libraries in Italy

Notes

References
  1886-

External links

 

1714 establishments in Italy
Culture in Florence
Culture of Tuscany
Deposit libraries
Government buildings in Italy
History of Florence
Libraries in Florence
Library buildings completed in 1935
Florence
Libraries established in 1714